

Crisis Command – Could You Run the Country? is a BBC Two role-playing interactive drama documentary which was based on realistic scenarios and dramatised situations that Britain could face one day. All episodes were first aired in 2004.

The programme gave three people the chance to run the country during a potential disaster. The crises included terror attacks on London, flood, plague and hostage taking. Viewers were able to make decisions interactively at the same time as the studio players. The programmes were filmed in real time and edited down to one-hour programmes. Each scenario was played once on BBC Two, and then redone with a different set of "Ministers" on BBC Four immediately afterwards.

They receive advice from military, police and communication experts, but the final decisions are down to them alone. Presented by Gavin Hewitt, Crisis Command – Could You Run The Country? was a test of confidence and the ability to prioritise and keep calm in a tense and rapidly evolving situation.

It examined the dilemmas ministers face when dealing with crisis, and the hard decisions necessary to make to save lives.

Against the clock, the participants were able to call upon three advisors: military advisor Lord Tim Garden, communications adviser Amanda Platell and emergency services advisor Charles Shoebridge.

Cast and crew 
 Gavin Hewitt, host
 Sir Tim Garden, military expert and co-host
 Amanda Platell, communications expert and co-host
 Charles Shoebridge, emergency services expert and co-host
 Peter Burnell, inventor

Episodes

References

External links
 
 Introduction

BBC television docudramas
2004 British television series debuts
2004 British television series endings
Disaster television series